George Martine may refer to:

 George Martine (historian) (1635–1712), Scottish historian
 George Martine (physician) (1700–1741), Scottish physician